Pernek is a village and municipality in Malacky District in the Bratislava Region of western Slovakia.

History
In historical records the village was first mentioned in 1394.

Geography
The municipality lies at an altitude of 278 metres and covers an area of 27.665 km2. It has a population of about 793 people.

References

External links

 Official page

Villages and municipalities in Malacky District